Harmsiopanax is a genus of woody, monocarpic flowering plants of a palmlike habit belonging to the family Araliaceae. It comprises 3 species, of which the most important is the gigantic Harmsiopanax ingens.

The genus name of Harmsiopanax is in honour of Hermann Harms (1870–1942), a German taxonomist and botanist. It was first described and published in H.G.A.Engler & K.A.E.Prantl, Nat. Pflanzenfam., Nachtr. Vol.1 on page 166 in 1897.

The genus is native to Java, the Lesser Sunda Islands, New Guinea and Sulawesi.

References

Other sources
 Philipson W.R., "A revision of Harmsiopanax (Araliaceae)", Blumea 21 (1973) 81-86.

Araliaceae
Apiales genera
Plants described in 1897